A mortal sin, in Catholic theology, is a gravely sinful act which can lead to damnation if a person does not repent of the sin before death. A sin is considered to be "mortal" when its quality is such that it leads to a separation of that person from God's saving grace. Three conditions must together be met for a sin to be mortal: "Mortal sin is sin whose object is grave matter and which is also committed with full knowledge and deliberate consent." The sin against the Holy Ghost and the sins that cry to Heaven for vengeance are considered especially serious. This type of sin is distinguished from a venial sin in that the latter simply leads to a weakening of a person's relationship with God. Despite its gravity, a person can repent of having committed a mortal sin. Such repentance is the primary requisite for forgiveness and absolution. Teaching on absolution from serious sins has varied somewhat throughout history. The current teaching for Catholics was formalized at the 16th-century Council of Trent.

Concept origins

New Testament
The term "mortal sin" is thought to be derived from the New Testament of the Bible. Specifically, it has been suggested by Jimmy Buehler from Theocast that the term comes from 1 John 5:16–17. In this particular verse, the author of the Epistle writes "There is a sin that leads to death."

Fathers of the Church
The concept is hinted at in some works of the early Fathers of the Church and explicit in others.

In AD 220, Tertullian in his De Pudicitia, 21 writes,

In AD 385, Pacian of Barcelona, in his Sermon Exhorting to Penance, gives contempt of God, murder, and fornication as examples of "mortal" or "capital sins."

In AD 393, St. Jerome writes:

Catholicism
In the moral theology of Catholicism, a mortal sin requires that all of the following conditions are met:
 Its subject matter must be grave. (The term "grave sin" is used at times to indicate grave matter, and at times to indicate mortal sin. But it always remains true that the following two conditions are requisite for mortal sin.)
 It must be committed with full knowledge (and awareness) of the sinful action and the gravity of the offense. 
 It must be committed with deliberate and complete consent.

The Catechism of the Catholic Church defines grave matter:

Although the Church itself does not provide a precise list of grave sins or divide actions into grave and venial categories, Church documents do name certain "grave sins" as well as "offenses" and "actions" whose subject-matter is considered to be grave. For example, in the area of human sexuality, the Catechism of the Catholic Church notes that the following actions can involve increased gravity: extramarital sex, divorce (but not legitimate separation), and masturbation. The sins against the Holy Ghost and the sins that cry to Heaven for vengeance are considered especially serious.

With respect to a person's full knowledge of a certain act being a grave sin, the Catholic Church teaches that "unintentional ignorance can diminish or even remove the imputability of a grave offense. But no one is deemed to be ignorant of the principles of the moral law, which are written in the conscience of every man. The promptings of feelings and passions can also diminish the voluntary and free character of the offense, as can external pressures or pathological disorders (mental illness). Sin committed through malice, by deliberate choice of evil, is the gravest." Furthermore, Catholic teaching also holds that "imputability and responsibility for an action can be diminished or even nullified by ignorance, inadvertence, duress, fear, habit, inordinate attachments, and other psychological or social factors." In this regard, a sin committed while one is inebriated may lack the awareness and consent necessary for the sin to be mortal. But when one becomes aware of the danger of excessive drink, such drinking itself becomes a serious matter.

Grave sins should not to be confused with the seven deadly sins, which are so called because they lead to other sins; they are not necessarily grave sins.

Mortal sins are called "grave sins" under the Code of Canon Law due to the "grave" nature of all mortal sins, and the terms are used there interchangeably. This does not deny the distinction given above, that there may be grave matter but not a grave sin if the other conditions of knowledge and freedom are not present.

Mortal sins must be confessed by naming the specific offence along with how many times it was committed.  Mention of how long since one's last confession is to establish whether one is truly penitent – has a purpose of amendment.

It is not necessary to confess venial sins although they may be confessed, a practice that began with the Irish monks around the 12th century. Venial sins are all sins that are not mortal. The Church encourages frequent, intelligent use of the sacrament of confession even if a person has only venial sins, in view of the benefits that might be derived.

According to the Catholic Church, no person can receive the Eucharist when in a state of mortal sin:

Some mortal sins cause automatic excommunication by the very deed itself, for example renunciation of faith and religion, known as apostasy, desecration of the Eucharistic species, and "a completed abortion". Those mortal sins are so serious that the Church through law has made them crimes. The Church forbids the excommunicated from receiving any sacrament (not just the Eucharist) and also severely restricts the person's participation in other Church liturgical acts and offices. A repentant excommunicated person may talk to a priest, usually in a confessional, about their excommunication to arrange for the remission. Remission cannot be denied to someone who has truly repented their actions and has also made suitable reparation for damages and scandal or at least has seriously promised to do so. However, even if excommunicated, a Catholic who has not been juridically absolved is still, due to the irrevocable nature of baptism, a member of the Catholic Church and therefore must still carry out their obligations of fulfilling their duties of attending Mass, Divine Liturgy, etc. on a Holy Day of Obligation, abstaining from meat on the Fridays of Lent, etc., albeit their communion with the Christ and the Church is gravely impaired. "Perpetual penalties cannot be imposed or declared by decree." However, "the following are expiatory penalties which can affect an offender either perpetually...."

Since the mid-twentieth century, some theologians have taught that a person who lives by a constant attitude of charity is unlikely to fall in and out of God's graces without being profoundly aware of the change. The term "fundamental option" arose and is used in a variety of senses.

Pope John Paul II reaffirmed traditional teaching going back to the Council of Trent in his encyclical Veritatis Splendor, as does the Catechism of the Catholic Church, which states: "The teaching of the Church affirms the existence of hell and its eternity. Immediately after death the souls of those who die in a state of mortal sin descend into hell, where they suffer the punishments of hell, 'eternal fire'." The Catechism then adds: "The chief punishment of hell is eternal separation from God, in whom alone man can possess the life and happiness for which he was created and for which he longs." However, the Catechism does not by name say a specific person is in Hell, but it does say that "...our freedom has the power to make choices for ever, with no turning back." Most significantly, the Catechism also proclaims that "There are no limits to the mercy of God..." and that "although we can judge that an act is in itself a grave offence, we must entrust judgment of persons to the justice and mercy of God." We cannot see into their mind to know if it was deliberate or committed in full knowledge. Also, like the father in the Parable of the Prodigal Son, God forgives those who repent sincerely. Vatican II, in its Dogmatic Constitution Lumen Gentium, reflects the traditional teaching of the Church on punishment, and on merit or reward for good deeds.

Mortal sin is ordinarily remitted by the priestly absolution in the Sacrament of Penance.  However, the effectiveness of the absolution is dependent of the acts of the penitent starting with sorrow for sin or contrition.  Perfect contrition, coupled with the firm resolution to sin no more and to make recourse to the sacrament of Penance as soon as possible, can restore a person's relationship with God, as well as God's saving grace, that is, sanctifying grace. This teaching on perfect contrition is a reminder that God's mercy and forgiveness is available outside the Sacrament of Penance, yet, also indicates that Catholics who know about Christ's institution of the sacrament of Penance must intend to use it.  Any human act that arises from a person's love of God, is inspired by God's prevenient action and is directed to doing as God requires. When perfect contrition is the means by which one seeks to restore one's relationship with God, there must also be a resolution to confess all mortal sins (that have not been confessed and absolved previously) in the Sacrament of Penance.

Eastern Catholic churches
Autonomous, self-governing, Catholic particular churches and liturgical rites in full communion with the Bishop of Rome, the Pope, are known as Eastern Catholic churches. They derive their theology and spirituality from some of the same sources as the Eastern Orthodox and Oriental Orthodox churches, yet use the Latin Catholic distinction between mortal and venial sin. However, names other than mortal and venial are often used.

Actions constituting grave matter
The following is a partial alphabetical list of actions that are defined as constituting grave matter, according to the Catechism of the Catholic Church or like sources (such as declarations by the Congregation for the Doctrine of the Faith, Apostolic Letters, or other sources printed by Church authorities).
 
{| class="wikitable"
|-
! width=140pt | Name
! width=500pt | Description
|-
|-
| Abortion
| "Direct abortion, that is, abortion willed as an end or as a means," is "gravely contrary to the moral law. The Church imposes the canonical penalty of excommunication for this crime against human life."
|-
| Encouragement of another's grave sins or vices
| "Every word or attitude is forbidden which by flattery, adulation, or complaisance encourages and confirms another in malicious acts and perverse conduct. Adulation is a grave fault if it makes one an accomplice in another's vices or grave sins. Neither the desire to be of service nor friendship justifies duplicitous speech. Adulation is a venial sin when it only seeks to be agreeable, to avoid evil, to meet a need, or to obtain legitimate advantages."
|-
| Adultery
| "... refers to marital infidelity. When two partners, of whom at least one is married to another party, have sexual relations – even transient ones – they commit adultery. Christ condemns even adultery of mere desire. The sixth commandment and the New Testament forbid adultery absolutely. The prophets denounce the gravity of adultery; they see it as an image of the sin of idolatry."
|-
| Apostasy
| "the total repudiation of the Christian faith"
|-
| Blasphemy
| "...is contrary to the respect due God and his holy name. It is in itself a grave sin."
|-
| Cheating and unfair wagers
| "Unfair wagers and cheating at games constitute grave matter, unless the damage inflicted is so slight that the one who suffers it cannot reasonably consider it significant."
|-
| Contraception
| "Similarly excluded is any action which either before, at the moment of, or after sexual intercourse, is specifically intended to prevent procreation – whether as an end or as a means."
"On the other hand, the Church does not consider at all illicit the use of those therapeutic means necessary to cure bodily diseases, even if a foreseeable impediment to procreation should result there from – provided such impediment is not directly intended for any motive whatsoever."
|-
| Detraction
| "who, without objectively valid reason, discloses another's faults and failings to persons who did not know them"
|-
| Defrauding a worker of a just wage
| "A just wage is the legitimate fruit of work. To refuse or withhold it can be a grave injustice. In determining fair pay both the needs and the contributions of each person must be taken into account. 'Remuneration for work should guarantee man the opportunity to provide a dignified livelihood for himself and his family on the material, social, cultural and spiritual level, taking into account the role and the productivity of each, the state of the business, and the common good.' Agreement between the parties is not sufficient to justify morally the amount to be received in wages."
|-
| Divorce 
| "If civil divorce remains the only possible way of ensuring certain legal rights, the care of the children, physical or mental safety, or the protection of inheritance, it can be tolerated and does not constitute a moral offense." To attempt remarriage (outside the Church) without pursuing dissolution of the prior marriage would constitute adultery and so be a grave matter.
|-
| Endangerment of human life or safety 
| ... endangering one's own life or the safety of others (e.g., by drunkenness, a love of speed on the road, at sea, or in the air, or gross negligence).
|-
| Participation in Freemasonry
| "The faithful who enroll in Masonic associations are in a state of grave sin and may not receive Holy Communion."<ref>[https://www.vatican.va/roman_curia/congregations/cfaith/documents/rc_con_cfaith_doc_19831126_declaration-masonic_en.html Declaration on Masonic associations]</ref>
|-
| Envy 
| ... if to the level of wishing grave harm to another.
|-
| Euthanasia
| ... of human beings. Euthanising animals is not considered an offense.
|-
| Extreme anger 
| ... at the level of truly and deliberately desiring to seriously hurt or kill someone
|-
| Fornication
| ... is carnal union between an unmarried man and an unmarried woman." 
"Among the sins gravely contrary to chastity are masturbation, fornication, pornography, and homosexual practices."
|-
| Hatred 
| ... of a neighbor to the point of deliberately desiring him or her great harm
|-
| Heresy
| "the obstinate post-baptismal denial of some truth which must be believed with divine and catholic faith, or it is likewise an obstinate doubt concerning the same"
|-
| Homosexual actions
| "Among the sins gravely contrary to chastity are masturbation, fornication, pornography, and homosexual practices."
|-
| Incest
| "... corrupts family relationships and marks a regression toward animality."
|-
| Lying
| Can be a mortal sin. The gravity is measured by "the truth it deforms, the circumstances, the intentions of the one who lies, and the harm suffered by its victims." If not grave matter, lying is a venial sin.
|-
| Masturbation
| The gravity is measured by, "the affective immaturity, force of acquired habit, conditions of anxiety or other psychological or social factors that lessen, if not even reduce to a minimum, moral culpability."
"Among the sins gravely contrary to chastity are masturbation, fornication, pornography, and homosexual practices."
|-
| Missing Mass
| "[T]he faithful are obliged to participate in the Eucharist on days of obligation, unless excused for a serious reason (for example, illness, the care of infants) or dispensed by their own pastor. Those who deliberately fail in this obligation commit a grave sin."

"Even if in the earliest times [Mass attendance] was not judged necessary to be prescriptive, the Church has not ceased to confirm this obligation of conscience, which rises from the inner need felt so strongly by the Christians of the first centuries. It was only later, faced with the half-heartedness or negligence of some, that the Church had to make explicit the duty to attend Sunday Mass: more often than not, this was done in the form of exhortation...The present Code reiterates ... saying that 'on Sundays and other holy days of obligation the faithful are bound to attend Mass'. This legislation has normally been understood as entailing a grave obligation." But the gravity of this omission may be seldom realized in practice today. 
|-
| Murder
| ... and aiding and abetting in murder. "The fifth commandment forbids doing anything with the intention of indirectly bringing about a person's death. The moral law prohibits exposing someone to mortal danger without grave reason, as well as refusing assistance to a person in danger. The acceptance by human society of murderous famines, without efforts to remedy them, is a scandalous injustice and a grave offense. Those whose usurious and avaricious dealings lead to the hunger and death of their brethren in the human family indirectly commit homicide, which is imputable to them. Unintentional killing is not morally imputable. But one is not exonerated from grave offense if, without proportionate reasons, he has acted in a way that brings about someone's death, even without the intention to do so." Self-defense or defense of others when there is no other way may involve homicide but does not constitute murder. However, the death penalty is no longer seen by the church's magisterium as being justifiable. Murder is viewed as especially reprehensible since humans were created in the image of God.
|-
| Perjury 
| "a perjury is committed when he makes a promise under oath with no intention of keeping it, or when after promising on oath he does not keep it."
|-
| Polygamy
| "... is contrary to the equal personal dignity of men and women who in matrimony give themselves with a love that is total and therefore unique and exclusive." The Christian who has previously lived in polygamy has a grave duty in justice to honor the obligations contracted in regard to his former wives and his children. 
|-
| Pornography
| "... does grave injury to the dignity of its participants (actors, vendors, the public), since each one becomes an object of base pleasure and illicit profit for others. It immerses all who are involved in the illusion of a fantasy world. It is a grave offense."
|-
| Practicing magic or sorcery
| "All practices of magic or sorcery, by which one attempts to tame occult powers, so as to place them at one's service and have a supernatural power over others – even if this were for the sake of restoring their health – are gravely contrary to the virtue of religion. These practices are even more to be condemned when accompanied by the intention of harming someone, or when they have recourse to the intervention of demons. Wearing charms is also reprehensible. Spiritism often implies divination or magical practices; the Church for her part warns the faithful against it. Recourse to so-called traditional cures does not justify either the invocation of evil powers or the exploitation of another's credulity."
|-
| Profanity against sacred matters
| ... "failing in respect toward Him in one's speech; in misusing God's name. St. James condemns those 'who blaspheme that honorable name [of Jesus] by which you are called.' The prohibition of blasphemy extends to language against Christ's Church, the saints, and sacred things. ... [profanity in which one takes the name of the LORD in vain] is contrary to the respect due God and His holy name. It is in itself a grave sin. ... The second commandment enjoins respect for the Lord's name. The name of the Lord is holy."
|-
| Prostitution 
| "While it is always gravely sinful to engage in prostitution, the imputability of the offense can be attenuated by destitution, blackmail, or social pressure."
|-
| Rape
| "... is the forcible violation of the sexual intimacy of another person. It does injury to justice and charity. Rape wounds the respect, freedom, and physical and moral integrity to which every person has a right. It causes grave damage that can mark the victim for life."
|-
| Sacrilege
| " ...consists in profaning or treating unworthily the sacraments and other liturgical actions, as well as persons, things, or places consecrated to God."
|-
| Scandal 
| Deliberately causing someone to sin gravely.
|- 
| Schism
| "... the refusal of submission to the Roman Pontiff or of communion with the members of the Church subject to him."
|-
| Simony 
| Buying or selling spiritual things, such as sacraments.
|-
|Stealing / Theft
|"Unjustly taking and keeping the property of another, against the reasonable will of the owner. Stealing is a violation of the seventh commandment of God, "You shall not steal.""
|-
| Suicide 
| "Grave psychological disturbances, anguish, or grave fear of hardship, suffering, or torture can diminish the responsibility of the one committing suicide."

"We should not despair of the eternal salvation of persons who have taken their own lives. By ways known to him alone, God can provide the opportunity for salutary repentance. The Church prays for persons who have taken their own lives."
|-
| Terrorism
| "Terrorism threatens, wounds, and kills indiscriminately; it is gravely against justice and charity."
|}

Eastern Orthodoxy
According to Father Allyne Smith, "While the Roman Catholic tradition has identified particular acts as 'mortal' sins, in the Orthodox tradition we see that only a sin for which we don't repent is 'mortal.'"

According to the Mission of The Orthodox Church in America, in answer to a parishioner's query:
In the Orthodox Church there are no "categories" of sin as found in the Christian West. In the pre-Vatican II Catholic catechism, sins were categorized as "mortal" and "venial." In this definition, a "mortal" sin was one which would prevent someone from entering heaven unless one confessed it before death. ...These categories do not exist in the Orthodox Church. Sin is sin. Concerning Confession, having a list of deadly sins could, in fact, become an obstacle to genuine repentance. For example, imagine that you commit a sin. You look on the list and do not find it listed. It would be very easy to take the attitude that, since it is not on a list of deadly sins, it is not too serious. Hence, you do not feel the need to seek God's forgiveness right away. A week passes and you have completely forgotten about what you had done. You never sought God's forgiveness; as a result, you did not receive it, either. We should go to Confession when we sin – at the very least, we should ask God to forgive us daily in our personal prayers. We should not see Confession as a time to confess only those sins which may be found on a list.

Though not part of the dogma of the Orthodox Church the mortal–venial distinction is assumed by some Orthodox authors and saints as a theologoumenon. For example, Saint Ignatius Brianchaninov (1807–1867), who wrote primarily for monks, says in his book A Word on Death, in a chapter entitled "Mortal sin":

Similarly, the Exomologetarion'' of Nicodemus the Hagiorite (1749–1809) distinguishes seven classes of sin:

 Pardonable
 Near the pardonable
 Non-mortal
 Near the non-mortal
 Between the mortal and the non-mortal
 Near the mortal
 Mortal

Nicodemus gives the following example for the seven classes of sin. "The initial movement of anger is pardonable; near to the pardonable is for someone to say harsh words and get hot-tempered. A non-mortal sin is to swear; near the non-mortal is for someone to strike with the hand. Between the non-mortal and the mortal is to strike with a small stick; near the mortal is to strike with a large stick, or with a knife, but not in the area of the head. A mortal sin is to murder. A similar pattern applies to the other sins. Wherefore, those sins nearer to the pardonable end are penanced lighter, while those nearer to the mortal end are more severely penanced."

He also stipulates seven conditions of sin:

 Who is the doer of the sin
 What sin was committed
 Why was it committed
 In what manner was it committed
 At what time/age was it committed
 Where was it committed
 How many times was it committed

See also 

 Ancestral sin
 Blasphemy against the Holy Ghost
 Blood atonement
 Original sin
 Seven deadly sins
 Sins that cry to heaven
 Jewish views on sin
 Islamic views on sin
 Catholic hamartiology

Notes

References

Further reading

External links
Catechism of the Catholic Church from the official website of the Vatican
The Council of Trent - Session XIV - The fourth under the Supreme Pontiff, Julius III, celebrated on November 25, 1551 - The Most Holy Sacraments Of Penance And Extreme Unction
Excerpt from the Exomologetarion of Nicodemus the Hagiorite

Catholic doctrines
Christian hamartiology
Christian terminology
Sin